Joseph Edward Stevens Jr. (June 23, 1928 – December 18, 1998) was a United States district judge of the United States District Court for the Eastern District of Missouri and the United States District Court for the Western District of Missouri.

Education and career

Born in Kansas City, Missouri, Stevens received a Bachelor of Arts degree from Yale University in 1949 and a Juris Doctor from the University of Michigan Law School in 1952. He was a lieutenant in the United States Naval Reserve from 1952 to 1960. He was on active duty from 1952 to 1955. He was in private practice in Kansas City, Missouri from 1955 to 1980.

Federal judicial service

Stevens was nominated by President Ronald Reagan on July 9, 1981, to a joint seat on the United States District Court for the Eastern District of Missouri and United States District Court for the Western District of Missouri vacated by Judge William Robert Collinson. He was confirmed by the United States Senate on September 16, 1981, and received his commission on September 18, 1981. He served as Chief Judge of the Western District only from 1992 to 1995. He assumed senior status on July 1, 1995. Stevens served in that capacity until his death in Kansas City, Missouri, on December 18, 1998.

References

Sources
 

1928 births
1998 deaths
Judges of the United States District Court for the Western District of Missouri
Judges of the United States District Court for the Eastern District of Missouri
United States district court judges appointed by Ronald Reagan
20th-century American judges
Yale University alumni
University of Michigan Law School alumni
United States Navy officers
20th-century American lawyers
United States Navy reservists